The Patriot on Sunday is a newspaper published in Botswana on Sundays. The newspaper was founded in 2012 and is partly owned by parliamentarian Mpho Balopi. The newspaper is indexed in AllAfrica.com. The newspaper was involved in a Freedom of the Press dispute with the Printing & Publishing Company Botswana because of a negative perspective on the ruling party.

Ownership 
The newspaper was owned by Botswana Democratic Party politician Mpho Balopi.  He sold the media company to Sadique Kebonang. Keobonang handed over the ownership of the newspaper to journalist Mpho Dibeela, who is the sole shareholder and director.

See also 

 Azhizhi
 Botswana Guardian
 The Voice (Botswana)

References

External links 
 

Newspapers published in Botswana
Weekly newspapers
2012 establishments in Botswana
African news websites